La Cheppe is a commune in the Marne department in the Grand Est region in north-eastern France. It is best known for being the place where Attila camped with his forces at the Battle of the Catalaunian Plains.

See also
Communes of the Marne department

References

Cheppe
Catalauni